Patrick Joseph McClure, AO (born 18 March 1949) advises governments on welfare reform, social policy, charity regulation and impact investment. He is a company director and a former chief executive officer of Mission Australia and the Society of St Vincent de Paul (NSW/ACT).

Education and early career
McClure was born in Auckland, New Zealand and migrated with his family to Australia at age 14 years. He commenced his secondary education at St Peter's College, Auckland and completed it at Waverley College, Sydney. In 1968, he joined the Franciscans (Order of Friars Minor), was ordained a priest in 1975 and resigned from the ministry in 1977. He then pursued a career in the social purpose sector.

He was a director of Amnesty International (1978–1988), working with refugees and coordinating global campaigns against human rights abuses.

He was founder and chair of Second Harvest (Australia), a social enterprise providing low cost food to people on low income (1978–1989), and awarded a Churchill Fellowship (1989) to study social enterprises in the US, Canada and the UK.

He worked as director of Migrant Services and area manager, Social Work, in the Department of Social Security (now the Department of Social Services) in Perth and Sydney (1985–1991).

McClure has a Master of Arts (Public Policy) from Murdoch University, WA (1987–1991), and a Bachelor of Social Work (Distinction) from Curtin University, WA (1978–1981). He also has a Diploma in Theological and Pastoral Studies from Yarra Theological Union, Vic (1975). He is a Graduate Member of the Australian Institute of Company Directors (AICD) (2005).

Career 
Chief Executive Officer, Society of St Vincent de Paul (NSW/ACT) (1992–1996)

McClure was CEO of the Society of St Vincent de Paul (NSW/ACT) during a period of major organisation reform. The Society had a budget of $375m, providing housing, youth, family services and social assistance to over 500,000 disadvantaged people each year. During his tenure, he was also a member of the NSW Government Drought Assistance Committee, which distributed $80 million in drought assistance to rural households across NSW in 1995–1996.

Chief Executive Officer, Mission Australia (1997–2006)

During McClure's tenure as CEO of Mission Australia, the organisation grew from separate state-based entities with annual revenue of $50m, to a national organisation with annual revenue exceeding $300m and 3000 staff providing employment, training, housing and other services to over 200,000 disadvantaged youth, adults, families and children.

The organisation became a major provider of employment services in the privatised Job Network. Mission Australia was also awarded the Prime Minister's Community Business Partnership Award in 2001.[3]

Mission Australia acquired a one-third shareholding in Working Links, a UK employment company, in 2005. In the same year, the organisation opened the Mission Australia Centre in Surry Hills, Sydney, providing integrated services for homeless people.

Chair, Reference Group on Welfare Reform (1999–2000)

McClure was appointed chair of the Australian government's Reference Group on Welfare Reform (1999-2000). The final report, "Participation Support for a More Equitable Society" (known as the McClure Report) outlined a blueprint for welfare reform. In the 2001 Federal Budget, the Australian Government committed $1.7 billion over four years to implement recommendations of the report called Australians Working Together.

Chief Executive Officer, Macquarie Capital Retirement Villages Group (2006–2008)

McClure was CEO of Macquarie Capital RVG, which raised $850m of institutional funds for investment in retirement villages in Australia and New Zealand.

Ethics Fellow, Centre for Social Impact, UNSW (2008–2010)

McClure was appointed Ethics Fellow at the Centre for Social Impact, University of New South Wales. Through workshops, conferences and articles, McClure presented applied ethics and an ethical decision-making framework for Third Sector organisations.

Chair, Reference Group on Welfare Reform (2013–2015)

In December 2013, Minister for Social Services Kevin Andrews announced that McClure would chair a Reference Group on Welfare Reform. An interim report was released on 29 June 2014, followed by roundtables with 175 key stakeholders in all states and territories, consultations with 55 people on income support, 271 formal submissions and 231 online comments.

The final report titled "A New System for Better Employment and Social Outcomes" was launched in Canberra on 23 February 2015 by Patrick McClure and the Minister for Social Services Scott Morrison. It proposed an integrated approach across four pillars of reform with an employment focus: a simpler and more sustainable income support system, building individual and family capacity, engaging employers, and building community capacity.

Key recommendations included: reducing the current complex and inefficient system of 20 payments and 55 supplements to five payments and four categories of supplements; a passport to work, enabling people to move easily between employment and the income support system; a new ICT system to drive efficiencies in the new income support system; an investment approach with early intervention services focusing on groups most at risk of long term welfare dependence; a jobs plan for people with disabilities and mental health conditions; and the use of social impact bonds to attract private investment to address social problems.

Since the 2015 budget, the Australian government has allocated funds for a new ICT system, a prerequisite for introducing a simpler income support system; the Priority Investment Approach contracting PwC to complete annual actuarial valuations of groups at risk of lifetime welfare dependence; allocations to organisations from the $100m Try, Test and Learn Fund; simplification of child and youth payments; support for social impact investment in affordable housing; and a new JobSeeker Payment to replace or consolidate seven existing payments.

Chair, Oak Tree Retirement Villages Group (2018–2022)

The Oak Tree Group specialises in providing affordable, stylish and secure retirement living communities across Australia.

Chair, Review Panel, Australian Charities and Not-for-Profits Commission Legislation (2017–2018)

In 2017, Assistant Minister to the Treasurer Michael Sukkar announced that McClure would chair a review of the ACNC Legislation. The final report, "Strengthening for Purpose: Australian Charities and Not-for-Profits Legislation Commission Review 2018", made 30 recommendations relating to functions, powers, governance, basic religious charities, secrecy, advocacy, criminal misconduct, harmonisation of fundraising, one-stop-shop, and a national scheme for charities. The Australian Government response in March 2020 implemented 19 of the recommendations.

Current and recent roles

He is a member of the NSW Treasury, Office of Social Impact Investment Expert Advisory Group.

He is a director of the Waverley College Advisory Council.

He is a director of the Institute of Strategic Management.

He was an adjunct professor of the Australian Catholic University (ACU).

He is an associate of The Brown Collective.

He is a selector for Community Services of the Churchill Trust (NSW).

He was a director of the Kincare Group (2013–2018).

Government boards

 Delegate to the Australian Government's Australia 2020 Summit (2008)
 Commissioner of the Australian Fair Pay Commission (2006–2009)
 Member of the Prime Minister's Community Business Partnership Board (1998–2007)
 Chair of the OECD Local Employment and Economic Development Forum on Social Innovation (2004–2006)
 Deputy Chair of the Welfare to Work Consultative Forum (2005–2006)
 Member of the Board for A New Tax System (1999–2000)

Honours

 Officer of the Order of Australia (AO) for "services to the community through the development of social capital policy initiatives, and in the delivery of programs addressing social justice, welfare support, health and employment generation issues" (2003)
 Australian Centenary of Federation Medal for "service to the community" (2001)
 Distinguished Alumni Award, Murdoch University, WA for significant contribution to his profession and the community (2016)
 Australian Financial Review True Leader (2005)
 Equity Trustees EQT CEO Award for Lifetime Achievement recognising "leadership excellence in the non-profit sector" (2002)
Churchill Fellow, 1989

Notes

References
 
 St Peter's College Magazine 1960–1963

External links
 Welfare Reform article published in The Australian Financial Review – July 24, 2016 The Australian Financial Review
 Welfare Reform article published in The Weekend Australian – April 16, 2016 The Weekend Australian
 Patrick McClure joins Alan Jones to discuss welfare reform – March 10, 2015 2GB Radio
 Patrick McClure talks about welfare reform with the intergenerational report – March 5, 2015 2GB Radio
 Patrick McClure talks about his proposed changes to the welfare system – February 25, 2015 2GB Radio
 Welfare review by Patrick McClure lays out plan for simplified payments, tightening eligibility for disability support – February 25 2015, abc.net.au

Australian Friars Minor
1949 births
Living people
Australian people of Irish descent
New Zealand people of Irish descent
New Zealand Roman Catholics
People educated at St Peter's College, Auckland